Stuart Meeson (born 1972) is a physicist who having done research in Electrical Impedance Tomography and Mammography has been working in Computed Tomography (CT) with the Radiology Group of the University of Oxford. Areas of particular interest include imaging the cervical spine, abdominal sepsis and low contrast features in the abdomen and liver. His work in CT led to a collaborative study with the UK Health Protection Agency on the Third UK national CT dose survey.

Stuart Meeson lives in Hampshire. He is a keen amateur horticulturalist, who has exhibited in both local and national horticultural shows.

Background and education
Stuart Meeson, younger son of Trevor and Mary Meeson of Newport, Shropshire, was educated at Adams' Grammar School (1983-1990), Newport. Afterwards he studied at the University of Southampton gaining a bachelor's degree in Physics with Hons. (1993), before studying for a doctorate (Ph.D.) in medical physics (1997) -  An investigation of optimal performance criteria in Electrical impedance tomography. Five scientific papers were published in peer reviewed journals on this work. He was also awarded the poster prize at the 1st Joint IPSM and BES Annual Scientific Meeting 1994 - University of Keele.

Professional qualifications
Professional qualifications include CPhys (Chartered Physicist) from the Institute of Physics (1999), CSci (Chartered Scientist) from the Science Council (2004). Registered as a state registered Clinical Scientist by The Council For Professions Supplementary To Medicine (1999; registrations are now administered by the Health Professions Council). Associate member of the Linnean Society of London (2022).

Medical imaging & clinical physics research

Early career path
He then settled Hampshire and continued with his medical imaging and clinical physics research. Early in his career he took an interest in mammography research working for the UK NHS Breast Screening Programme, based at the Royal Surrey County Hospital (Guildford, Surrey). After completing two reports and publishing six scientific papers he moved to the Clinical Physics Department of the Royal London Hospital where he explored therapeutic applications of microwaves. The aim of the research was to develop a new method of treating the pre-cancerous condition Barrett’s esophagus, a condition that increases the risk of oesophageal cancer (adenocarcinoma). Two scientific papers were published along with an article on using ultrasound to measure the rate of change of haemodynamic response at the onset of exercise in normal limbs and those with intermittent claudication. He was awarded the IPEM  Spiers’ Prize for 2003 for an extended one thousand-word abstract detailing the Barrett’s oesophagus research.

Current research
Current research on multi-slice/detector computed tomography (MDCT) is being undertaken in the Radiology Group of the University of Oxford. Work involves balancing image quality and radiation exposure for patients undergoing MDCT for medical purposes. Areas of particular interest include imaging the cervical spine, abdominal sepsis and low contrast features in the abdomen and liver. In collaboration with Health Protection Agency’s (HPA) Medical Dosimetry Group, he was responsible for the design of the third UK national CT dose survey and data collection. A final report on Doses from CT Examinations in the UK (2011 Review) was published by Public Health England in September 2014. Early results from the CT dose survey were presented at the UKRC conference in Manchester 2011 and later reported by AuntMinnieEurope. (AuntMinnie features the latest news and information about medical imaging.) The clinical expansion of CT and radiation dose are also discussed in Chapter 2 of the updated Springer book “Radiation Dose from Multidetector CT” (2nd edition; August 31, 2012 pp.21-32). Four scientific papers have been published and a scientific e-Poster paper on a diagnostic accuracy study was awarded the IPEM Poster Prize for best electronic poster exhibition at the UKRC Congress 2008.

( EC work was financially supported by the EC-EURATOM 6 Framework Programme (2002-2007) and formed part of the CT Safety & Efficacy (Safety and Efficacy of Computed Tomography (CT): A broad perspective) project, contract FP6/002388.)

Work as an amateur horticulturalist
Stuart Meeson also has a very keen interest in horticulture and plant science. He is a member of many UK based horticultural societies and exhibits regularly at their horticultural shows. He was awarded the RHS Banksian Medal at the Dogmersfield, Winchfield and Crookham Village Horticultural Show 2010. After specialising more in flowering orchids in 2011 he was awarded the Ernie Self Novice Trophy at the Orchid Society of Great Britain (OSGB) Autumn Show. Later in 2014 he was awarded the RHS Banksian Medal at the OSGB Spring Show. As a keen grower of terrestrial orchids and Pleurothallidinae the first of five Certificates of Cultural Commendation was awarded for the terrestrial orchid Epipactis gigantea 'Trefor' by the RHS Orchid Committee in June 2015. At the 25th Anniversary Show he was awarded an RHS Gold medal and Best Flower Box at RHS Hampton Court Palace Flower Show 2015, for his exhibit celebrating 800 years of the Magna Carta. Many of his flowering orchids are grown in globes and terrariums to increase the local humidity and promote flowering, and in March 2017 a Certificate of Cultural Commendation for Masdevallia mendozae 'Mullus' growing in a large globe was awarded by the RHS Orchid Committee. At the inaugural RHS Chatsworth Flower Show (2017) he was awarded an RHS Silver Floral medal for a display of orchids for the home and garden in the Floral Marquee. After being encouraged to grow Pleione (plant) in large pans or bowls, in April 2018 Stuart was awarded Best Hybrid Orchid at the RHS London Orchid Show for Pleione Tongariro. The Guinness World Record for the most blooms on an orchid plant (sympodial) is 1,684 and was achieved by Stuart Meeson (UK), with his Epipactis gigantea 'Trefor', in Fleet, Hampshire, UK, as verified on 9 June 2018. In March 2022 Stuart was awarded Best Hybrid Orchid at the first RHS Wisley Orchid Show for Masdevallia Prince Charming 'Trevor'. Two Haven Hybrid orchids have been registered with the International Cultivar Registration Authority for Orchid Hybrids administered by the Royal Horticultural Society (RHS).

References

External links
 

1972 births
Living people
English physicists
Alumni of the University of Southampton
People from Newport, Shropshire